Trenton station could refer to:

 Trenton Transit Center, a train station in Trenton, New Jersey
 West Trenton station, another train station in Trenton, New Jersey
 Trenton station (Atlantic Coast Line Railroad), a disused train station in Trenton, Florida
 Trenton station (Reading Railroad), a disused train station in Trenton, New Jersey